Stepney and Poplar was a parliamentary constituency in London, which returned one Member of Parliament (MP)  to the House of Commons of the Parliament of the United Kingdom.

It was created for the February 1974 general election, largely replacing the old Stepney constituency, and abolished for the 1983 general election, when it was partly replaced by the new Bethnal Green and Stepney constituency.

Boundaries
The London Borough of Tower Hamlets wards of Limehouse, Poplar East, Poplar Millwall, Poplar South, Poplar West, Redcoat, St Dunstan's, St Katharine's, St Mary's, and Shadwell.

Members of Parliament

Election results

References 

Parliamentary constituencies in London (historic)
Constituencies of the Parliament of the United Kingdom established in 1974
Constituencies of the Parliament of the United Kingdom disestablished in 1983
Stepney
Poplar, London